Jimi Quidd, born Jim Hatzidimitriou (December 1, 1953 – August 15, 1990) was a Greek-American performer and music producer. He was the lead singer of the New York pop punk band the Dots and also discovered and produced the hardcore band Bad Brains.

References

External links
 Greek Rembetika Music
  as Jimmy Quidd
  as Jimmi Quidd
 

American people of Greek descent
1953 births
1990 deaths
American record producers
Place of birth missing
American punk rock singers
20th-century American singers